Nagpur Orangers is a tennis team representing the Indian city of Nagpur in Champions Tennis League. The players representing this team are Àlex Corretja, Feliciano López, Jelena Janković, Divij Sharan.

Players

References

Tennis teams in India
Sports teams in Maharashtra
Sport in Nagpur
2015 establishments in Maharashtra
Sports clubs established in 2015